Aquimarina atlantica  is a Gram-negative and long-rod-shaped bacterium from the genus of Aquimarina which has been isolated from seawater from the Atlantic Ocean.

References 

Flavobacteria
Bacteria described in 2015